Constructed in 1907, the McCreary County Museum is housed in the former Stearns Coal and Lumber Company corporate headquarters in Stearns, Kentucky. The building served as the company's office headquarters in the Southern United States, and maintains the company president's office as an exhibit. The town where the museum is located was called the Stearns Empire of the South, and the museum continues to preserve and display the area's history from the Indian and pioneer times into the town's peak at the height  of the coal and lumber industry boom. The exhibits include significant coverage of  Appalachian life in McCreary County, including an exhibit on moonshine.

The museum uses the first floor of the 16,000 square foot building to display artifacts, including historic documents, objects, and photographs pertaining to  McCreary County and the Stearns Coal & Lumber Company. A permanent exhibit honoring the life of Wilburn K. Ross displays the Medal of Honor winner's uniform and photographs.  The second floor and third floors are closed to the public.

The museum is adjacent to the depot of the Big South Fork Scenic Railway, a heritage railroad, on tracks that were used by the Kentucky & Tennessee Railway, along the Southern Railway.

See also 
 Barthell, Kentucky: Stearns Coal and Lumber Company town in McCreary County, Kentucky
 Blue Heron, Kentucky: Stearns Coal and Lumber Company town in McCreary County, Kentucky
 Justus Smith Stearns: Founder of Stearns Coal and Lumber Company
 Stearns, Kentucky: Stearns Coal and Lumber Company town in McCreary County, Kentucky

References

External links

McCreary County Museum

Museums established in 1988
Museums in McCreary County, Kentucky
History museums in Kentucky
National Register of Historic Places in McCreary County, Kentucky
Historic district contributing properties in Kentucky